Point of reference is the intentional use of one thing to indicate something else, and may refer to:
 Reference point (disambiguation), general usage
 Frame of reference, physics usage